Ásta Breiðfjörð Gunnlaugsdóttir (born 13 May 1961) is an Icelandic former footballer who made 26 appearances for the Iceland women's national football team. At club level, she played for Breiðablik for over 20 years.

Personal life
Ásta was born on 13 May 1961. As a youngster, she played football and handball. Ásta is in a relationship with Samúel Örn Erlingsson. The couple live on the outskirts of Hella, and have previously lived in the United Kingdom. The couple have two daughters, both of whom have played football for Breiðablik. Her step-father Hermann Áskell Gunnarsson died in 2020.

Career
Ásta made her debut for Breiðablik women's team at the age of 13. In 1985, Ásta scored 20 goals in 13 games for Breiðablik. Her goal tally was an Úrvalsdeild kvenna record for 28 years, until it was beaten by Harpa Þorsteinsdóttir. Ásta played for Breiðablik for over 20 years. In total, she made 181 appearances for Breiðablik, scoring 206 goals, more than any other Breiðablik player in history. She won 10 Úrvalsdeild kvenna championships, and was the league's top scorer three times. She also won the Icelandic Women's Football Cup in 1981 and 1983. Ásta scored two goals in the 1981 final, and one goal in the 1983 final.

At international level, Ásta played 26 matches for the Iceland women's national football team, scoring 8 times. Between 1981 and 1994, she played in all but three of Iceland's matches; she missed three matches as she was on maternity leave. She scored in Iceland's first ever match, which they lost 3–2.

Ásta retired from professional football in 1994. In the same year, she was awarded the Icelandic Footballer of the Year award, making her the first women to win the award. In 2015, Ásta and Sigurður Grétarsson were admitted into the Breiðablik hall of fame.

References

External links
 

1961 births
Living people
Asta B. Gunnlaugsdottir
Women's association football forwards
Asta B. Gunnlaugsdottir
Asta B. Gunnlaugsdottir